Grivel was a French automobile manufacturer based in Neuilly-sur-Seine. Production started in 1896 and ended in 1897.

Vehicles 
In 1896 a Grivel Tricycle-Tandem took part in the Paris-Marseille race, but suffered an accident. The vehicle was powered by an air-cooled, horizontal two-cylinder petrol engine that produced 2 HP.

In 1897 a Quadricycle with rear engine was available. It featured a tubular frame and the same 2 HP engine as in the Tricycle-Tandem. The driving power was transmitted directly to the rear axle by a gearbox. The total weight was 180 kg.

See also
Astresse

Literature
David Burgess Wise, The New Illustrated Encyclopedia of Automobiles.

References 

1890s cars
Defunct motor vehicle manufacturers of France
Cars introduced in 1897